Saudi Arabia does not have any permanent rivers, but does have numerous wadis (valleys) which are riverbeds that are either permanently or intermittently dry.

This list is arranged by drainage basin, with respective tributaries indented under each larger stream's name.

Red Sea

Wadi Aful
Wadi as Surr
Wadi al-Hamd
Wadi al-Jizl
Wadi al-Aqiq
Wadi Rabigh
Wadi Fāţimah
Wadi Sa‘dīyah
Wadi al-Līth
Wadi Idam

Syrian Desert

Wadi Saba
Wadi Fajr
Wadi as Sirhan
Wadi al-Mirah
Wadi Hamir
Wadi Ar'ar
Wadi al Batin

Najd

Wadi al-Rummah
Wadi al-Batin
Wadi al Jarīr
Wadi ar Rishā’
Wadi Hanifa
Wadi ad-Dawasir
Wadi Bishah
Wadi Tathlith
Wadi Habawnah

References
Rand McNally, The New International Atlas, 1993.

 

Saudi Arabia
Rivers